Shendabad (also Romanized as Shendābād; formerly, Shindavar (Persian: شيندِوار), also Romanized as Shīndevār, Shindivar, Shindiwār, and Shindyvar) is a city in the Central District of Shabestar County, East Azerbaijan province, Iran. At the 2006 census, its population was 8,797 in 2,220 households. The following census in 2011 counted 9,034 people in 2,474 households. The latest census in 2016 showed a population of 8,489 people in 2,703 households.

References 

Shabestar County

Cities in East Azerbaijan Province

Populated places in East Azerbaijan Province

Populated places in Shabestar County